Snuffy may refer to:

People
 Snuffy Browne (1890–1964), West Indian cricketer
 Snuffy Jenkins (1909–1990), American banjo player
 Leighton W. Smith Jr. (born 1939), retired United States Navy four-star admiral
 Maynard Harrison Smith (1911–1984), United States Air Force staff sergeant and Medal of Honor recipient
 Snuffy Stirnweiss (1918–1958), American Major League Baseball player
 W. G. Snuffy Walden (born 1950), American musician and composer, often credited as Snuffy Walden

Fictional characters
 Mr. Snuffleupagus, also known as Snuffy, a character on the television show Sesame Street
 Snuffy Smith, in the comic strip Barney Google and Snuffy Smith
 A character on the television show Jay Jay the Jet Plane

Restaurants
 Snuffy's Malt Shop, an American hamburger restaurant chain

Lists of people by nickname